is the traditional name of the month of November in the Japanese calendar and a Japanese surname. It can also refer to:
Haruka Shimotsuki, Japanese singer and doujin composer 
Japanese destroyer Shimotsuki, a Japanese naval destroyer, sunk in World War II

Japanese-language surnames